The 2005 Croatian local elections were held on 15 May. This was fourth local elections in Croatian since independence.

In the elections for the members of representative bodies of local and regional self-government units, the citizens of the Republic of Croatia elected 426 municipal and 123 city councils and members of 20 county assemblies and the Zagreb City Assembly at 6,589 polling stations in Croatia. In the time of elections 4,015,832  voters were registered in Croatia.

Electoral system 
Councilors of regional and local council are elected by closed list proportional system with a number of seats depending on number of inhabitants in area. By law, municipalities with up to 3,000 inhabitants elect between 7 and 13 councilors, municipalities with between 3,000 and 10,000 councilors elect between 9 and 15 councilors, municipalities and cities with between 10,000 and 30,000 inhabitants elect between 13 and 19 councilors, cities with over 30,000 inhabitants elect between 19 and 35 councilors, while the City of Zagreb elects 51 councilors. Counties numbers between 31 and 51 councilors, regardless of population. The electoral threshold was set on 5%. The number of seats can differ from above mentioned because of special seats for national minorities that are given independently.

Election results

Counties

Cities

Elections in capital 
2005 Zagreb local elections

References

2005
2005 in Croatia
Croatia